A99 or A-99 may refer to:

 A99 road (Great Britain), a major road in the United Kingdom
 A 99 motorway (Germany)
 Dutch Defence, in the Encyclopaedia of Chess Openings
 Sony Alpha 99, a DSLT camera